France-Amérique is a bilingual, monthly print magazine focused on French-American culture and lifestyle, published in the United States and in France.

History

France-Amérique was created in 1943 by French exiles in New York City to raise awareness about Occupied France in the United States, and to support the Resistance movement led by Charles de Gaulle. In the 1960s, it became the property of the French daily, Le Figaro, as a weekly international edition, and became the newspaper of reference for the French community in the United States.

In 2007, France-Amérique adopted a bi-monthly format when it merged with the monthly newspaper Journal Français, which was then the largest French-language publication in the United States. France-Amérique became monthly and adopted a magazine format in May 2008. The magazine was purchased by French-American author and publisher Guy Sorman in June 2013 and adopted the monthly magazine style it has today.
In May 2015, France-Amérique eventually merged with France Magazine, a monthly English-language publication launched in 1985 by the French Embassy in Washington to promote French culture and l'art de vivre among Americans who loved France, but did not necessarily speak its language. France-Amérique has been published in French and in English ever since.

See also
 List of French-language newspapers published in the United States

References

External links
 France-Amérique official website

Bilingual magazines
French-language magazines
Lifestyle magazines published in the United States
Magazines established in 1943
Magazines published in New York City
Monthly magazines published in the United States
Bimonthly magazines published in the United States